Philip O'Mulloyre was a priest in Ireland in the 15th century: he was Dean of Clogher from 1422 to 1451.

References

15th-century Irish Roman Catholic priests
Deans of Clogher